Hot Springs (Montana Salish: nayyákʷ, Kutenai: Kutmiʔk) is a town on the Flathead Indian Reservation in Sanders County, Montana, United States. The population was 557 at the 2020 census. Founded in 1910, it was incorporated in 1929.

Previously it was known as both Camas and Camas Hot Springs for the camas plant that grows abundantly in the region.

Geography
Hot Springs is located at  (47.608957, -114.672063).

It is located near several mineral hot springs, from which the town derives its name.

Communications
The town of Hot Springs was featured in an article in Time Magazine regarding cell phone service. The town currently has a single cell phone tower operated by the Hot Springs Telephone Company, with ATT service.  Wi-Fi is currently available in selected locations in and around town.

Demographics

2010 census
As of the census of 2010, there were 544 people, 297 households, and 108 families living in the town. The racial makeup of the town was 77.8% White, 0.6% African American, 9.9% Native American, 0.2% Asian, 1.7% from other races, and 9.9% from two or more races. Hispanic or Latino of any race were 4.2% of the population.

There were 297 households, of which 17.8% had children under the age of 18 living with them, 22.2% were married couples living together, 10.1% had a female householder with no husband present, 4.0% had a male householder with no wife present, and 63.6% were non-families. 55.9% of all households were made up of individuals, and 23.2% had someone living alone who was 65 years of age or older. The average household size was 1.72 and the average family size was 2.64.

The median age in the town was 54 years. 15.8% of residents were under the age of 18; 5.6% were between the ages of 18 and 24; 14.7% were from 25 to 44; 37% were from 45 to 64; and 26.8% were 65 years of age or older. The gender makeup of the town was 47.2% male and 52.8% female.

2000 census
As of the census of 2000, there were 531 people, 280 households, and 126 families living in the town. The population density was 1,739.1 people per square mile (661.4/km2). There were 385 housing units at an average density of 1,260.9 per square mile (479.5/km2). The racial makeup of the town was 84.93% White, 0.19% African American, 9.98% Native American, 0.19% Asian, 1.13% from other races, and 3.58% from two or more races. Hispanic or Latino of any race were 3.58% of the population.

There were 280 households, out of which 16.4% had children under the age of 18 living with them, 33.6% were married couples living together, 8.9% had a female householder with no husband present, and 55.0% were non-families. 50.7% of all households were made up of individuals, and 23.6% had someone living alone who was 65 years of age or older. The average household size was 1.81 and the average family size was 2.64.

In the town, the population was spread out, with 18.3% under the age of 18, 2.4% from 18 to 24, 21.8% from 25 to 44, 29.2% from 45 to 64, and 28.2% who were 65 years of age or older. The median age was 50 years. For every 100 females there were 87.0 males. For every 100 females age 18 and over, there were 84.7 males.

The median income for a household in the town was $12,663, and the median income for a family was $21,786. Males had a median income of $26,250 versus $13,750 for females. The per capita income for the town was $12,690. About 33.3% of families and 38.2% of the population were below the poverty line, including 50.8% of those under age 18 and 20.2% of those age 65 or over.

Culture
Hot Springs is popular to visitors for its hot springs pools where people come and soak in the mineral water.

Another big attraction is the "Hot Springs Artists Society" which does many things but is most noted for bringing musical groups to a local Hotel at least twice per week, Fridays and Saturdays.  The music genres are generally "Blues," "Folk," "Country" or some combination of all three from local and visiting artists.  Occasionally there are special concerts of artists which may include a special concert on Sunday.  In summer, the stage moves outdoors.

Popular with tourists is also LaRue Hot Springs Museum.

Education
Hot Springs School District educates students from kindergarten through 12th grade. Hot Springs High School's team name is Savage Heat.

Preston Hot Springs Library serves the area.

Transportation
The Hot Springs Airport is a county-owned public-use airport located two nautical miles (4 km) east of the central business district of Hot Springs.

Additional transportation, ground transportation, is available from Sanders County Transportation which operates shuttle vans and buses to and from several cities and towns in Sanders, Flathead and Missoula Counties.  From Hot Springs, "Hot Springs Transit" (Sanders County Transportation) will take adults (any age) from their home to Missoula, Kalispell, Plains, Polson, and Thompson Falls, Montana on specific days each week.  Hot Springs Transit also takes riders from their home to other places in Hot Springs (rider's choices) ~ 4 times per month.  Other local transportation may be available on request. Hot Springs Transit is coordinated by Sanders County Council for the aging in Hot Springs.

See also

 List of municipalities in Montana

References

External links

 Hot Springs Chamber of Commerce

Towns in Sanders County, Montana
Hot springs of Montana
Landforms of Sanders County, Montana
1910 establishments in Montana